Osteoglycin (also called mimecan), encoded by the OGN gene, is a human protein.

This gene encodes a protein which induces ectopic bone formation in conjunction with transforming growth factor beta. This protein is a small keratan sulfate proteoglycan which contains tandem leucine-rich repeats (LRR). The gene expresses three transcript variants.

The level of expression of this gene has been correlated with enlarged hearts and more specifically left ventricular hypertrophy.

References

Further reading

Proteoglycans
Extracellular matrix proteins